Greek National Road 50 is a national highway on the island of Cephalonia, Greece. It connects Argostoli with Sami.

50
Cephalonia
Roads in the Ionian Islands (region)